Kilmelford is a village in Argyll and Bute, Scotland.

Points of interest
An Sithean (Kilmelford Cave)
Arduaine Gardens
Clachan Bridge, the Bridge over the Atlantic
The Cuilfail Hotel 
Boaby The Policeman’s Garden of Remembrance
Kilmartin Glen prehistoric sites
Kilmelford Church
Slate Islands, including Easdale Island Folk Museum

References

External links

Arduaine, Kilmelford and Kilninver Home Page

Villages in Argyll and Bute